Marvin G. Goldman (born June 1, 1939) is a New York City-based lawyer, aviation historian, and the world's largest collector of memorabilia related to El Al Israel Airlines.

Goldman is the author of two books on the subject, most recently El Al: Israel's Flying Star, published in 2009. His first book, El Al: Star in the Sky, was published in 1990.

References

External links

 The Forward 
 Airways Magazine 
 Amazon.com—El Al: Star in the Sky 

Aviation writers
Living people
1939 births